Andreas Freiherr von Ettingshausen (25 November 1796 – 25 May 1878) was an Austrian mathematician and physicist.

Ettingshausen studied philosophy and jurisprudence at the University of Vienna. In 1817, he joined the University of Vienna and taught mathematics and physics as an adjunct professor. In 1819, he became professor of physics at the University of Innsbruck and 1821 professor of higher mathematics at the University of Vienna. His lectures of that time marked a new era for the University of Vienna, and they were published in 1827 in two volumes. In 1834 Ettingshausen became the chair of physics.

Ettingshausen was the first to design an electromagnetic machine, which used the electrical induction for power generation. He promoted optics and wrote a textbook of physics. His method of lecturing was widely influential. In addition he wrote a book on combinatorial analysis (Vienna 1826). In 1866, he retired.

His daughter Carolina Augusta von Ettingshausen was the grandmother of Rudolf Allers.

References

External links 
 
 Biography of Ettingshausen (in German)
 

19th-century Austrian physicists
19th-century Austrian mathematicians
University of Vienna alumni
Academic staff of the University of Vienna
Academic staff of the University of Innsbruck
German untitled nobility
Austrian people of German descent
Scientists from Heidelberg
1796 births
1878 deaths
Austro-Hungarian mathematicians